The following are the national records in athletics in Belarus maintained by Belarus Athletic Federation (BFLA).

Outdoor

Key to tables:

+ = en route to a longer distance

h = hand timing

Wo = women only race

a = automatic timing but hundredths not known

X = subsequently annulled for doping violation

Men

Women

Mixed

Indoor

Men

Women

Notes

References
General
Belarus Records 2 August 2020 updated
Specific

External links
BFLA web site

Belarus
Records
Athletics
Athletics